The 1930 Dutch East Indies census was the last census of the Dutch East Indies. The total population was enumerated to be 60,727,233.

References

Citations

Bibliography

External links 
 Census of 1930 in Netherlands India at the Royal Tropical Institute

1930 censuses
1930 in the Dutch East Indies
Censuses in the Dutch East Indies